Eguchipsammia is a genus of corals belonging to the family Dendrophylliidae.

The genus has almost cosmopolitan distribution.

Species:

Eguchipsammia cornucopia 
Eguchipsammia fistula 
Eguchipsammia gaditana 
Eguchipsammia japonica 
Eguchipsammia serpentina 
Eguchipsammia strigosa 
Eguchipsammia wellsi

References

Dendrophylliidae
Scleractinia genera